Montauban or Montauban-Ville-Bourbon is a railway station serving the town of Montauban, Tarn-et-Garonne department, southwestern France.

The station
The station lies on the Bordeaux–Sète railway and it is the southern terminus of the Orléans–Montauban railway.
The Bordeaux–Sète railway opened through Montauban in 1856 and it is thought this is when the station opened. The line from Paris via Orléans opened on 4 October 1884.

The name Montauban-Ville-Bourbon is used to distinguish it from the now closed station of Montauban-Ville-Nouvelle.

The station is served by TGV (high speed), Intercités (long distance, also night train) and TER (local) services operated by SNCF.

Train services
The following services currently call at Montauban-Ville-Bourbon:
high speed services (TGV inOui and Ouigo) Paris-Bordeaux–Toulouse
intercity services (Intercités) Paris–Vierzon–Limoges–Toulouse
intercity services (Intercités) Bordeaux–Toulouse–Montpellier–Marseille
night services (Intercités de nuit) Paris–Orléans–Souillac–Toulouse
local service (TER Occitanie) Brive-la-Gaillarde–Cahors–Montauban–Toulouse
local service (TER Occitanie) Montauban–Toulouse
local service (TER Occitanie) Agen–Montauban–Toulouse

References

Railway stations in Tarn-et-Garonne
Railway stations in France opened in 1856